This is a list of ambassadors of Argentina to Pakistan. The present ambassador is Leopoldo Francisco Sahores. The ambassador is based at the Argentine embassy in Islamabad and is concurrently accredited as a non-resident ambassador to Afghanistan and Tajikistan.

List of ambassadors
The following is a partial list of Argentine ambassadors to Pakistan:
 M. Alberto M. Soria (1948)
 Paul Desmaras Lazurtiaga (1981–1984)
 Silvio H. Neuman (1992)
 Rodolfo J. Martin-Saravia (2004–2016)
 Ivan Ivanissevich (2016–2019)
 Leopoldo Francisco Sahores (2021–present)

Notes

References

 
Argentina
Pakistan